Pooja Chopra is an Indian actress. She won the title of Femina Miss India World 2009. She is the first Indian to win the "Beauty with a Purpose" title at the Miss World competition for India. As an actress, Chopra was awarded the Times Most Powerful Woman Award for her contribution to the field of acting. She got her breakthrough with Commando: A One Man Army and since then, appeared in many films. Pooja Chopra features in the Times list of 50 most beautiful faces of India.

Early life
Chopra was born in Kolkata, West Bengal, India. She was abandoned by her father at birth since he wanted a boy. Chopra's mother, Neera had to leave her marital home since she refused to admit Pooja to an orphanage in Kolkata, and she moved to Mumbai with both kids. She worked and brought up both girls by herself. She is a resident of Pune, Maharashtra. She has an older sister named Shubhra Chopra. She attended Mount Carmel Convent High School and later graduated from Ness Wadia College, both in Pune.

Career

2009–12: Career beginnings

Pooja Chopra was crowned with the 2009 Femina Miss India East title on 17 February 2009, in Kolkata. She also won Miss Perfect 10, Miss Catwalk, Miss Beautiful Smile, Talwarkars Best Body, and Nakshatra Miss Sparkling Beauty, thus gaining direct entry into the top ten finalists of the Femina Miss India 2009. On 5 April 2009, she was crowned the Pantaloons Femina Miss India-World 2009.

Chopra sprained her ankle while running down a flight of stairs one week prior to the Miss World Final, which was scheduled to take place on 12 December 2009; still, she participated in the competition and earned a positive response from the public. Doctors advised 3 weeks of complete bed-rest, but she continued with the competition. She finished as one of the top 16 finalists out of 120 contestants.

During her reign as Miss she endorsed brands such as Tata Docomo, Bajaj Allainz, Richfeel, Body and Soul, Roots Comb, Evolve Med Spa, and Juvederm Voluma.

2013–present: Acting

Chopra made her acting debut in the 2011 Tamil film Ponnar Shankar, playing the role of Princess Muthaayi, opposite Prashanth Thiagarajan. Before she made her debut in Bollywood as a leading lady, she had minor roles in Madhur Bhandarkar's films Fashion and Heroine.

Chopra acted in Vipul Shah's action film Commando opposite Vidyut Jammwal, in her first lead role. Chopra starred in Neeraj Pandey's short film Ouch, a dramatic love story.

Meena Iyer from Times of India said, "Pooja Chopra (Femina Miss India-2009) is super-confident in her film debut and a welcome addition to Bollywood's heroines".

Pooja has won 8 National and International Titles in 2009. She appeared in Kingfisher Calendar 2020. Pooja features in Times 50 Most beautiful faces India. Chopra's next films  Jahaan Chaar Yaar and Jeevan Beema Yojna both releasing in 2022.

She has given a TED Talk on the subject of "Write your own destiny : Journey of a once abandoned girl child". The talk happened in Krupanidhi Institution of Engineering, Bangalore.

Philanthropy 
On 12 December 2009, she won the "Beauty With a Purpose" title at Miss World 2009 based on her charitable work in the India "Nanhi Kali" project. She won US$10,000 for her project, which she donated to the NGO which helps small girls fight poverty.

Considering their shared interest in fitness, Pooja chopra, along with Akshay Kumar, launched the Asian Heart Institute Initiative "Happy Heart India" campaign for underprivileged children in 2018. Chopra was also invited by the BMC to lead the campaign #EkChammachKam alongside Farhan Akhtar to spread awareness about non-communicable diseases.

Post Pulwama attack in 2019, Pooja Chopra donated part of her Aiyaary earnings to families of Martyred Soldiers.

Filmography

Web series

References

External links

 
 
 Miss India – profile

Living people
Actresses from Pune
21st-century Indian actresses
Indian film actresses
Actresses in Hindi cinema
Actresses in Tamil cinema
Miss World 2009 delegates
Femina Miss India winners
Actresses from Kolkata
Female models from Kolkata
Year of birth missing (living people)